I Know I've Been Changed was the first successful play from playwright Tyler Perry. The play focuses on issues including child abuse and rape and how they are overcome by a strong belief in God.

Soul musician Ryan Shaw got his start performing in this play in 1998. The play received its first staging in Atlanta in 1992. The play toured from 1998 to 2000.

Grammy award winning vocalist Ann Nesby of the musical and instrumental group Sounds of Blackness played a supporting role in this play/production.

Plot
This hard-hitting play used comedy and drama to tell a story of two adult survivors of child abuse who became the people that their abusive mother said they would be. It is also the story of how they overcame, by the power of God, with a shocking twist at the end.
Mary, the lead character, married and had two children before she had the opportunity to become an adult herself. Emotionally and spiritually irresponsible, she sought the succor of drugs to alleviate the pressure of rearing her children. This drug abuse manifests itself in verbal, emotional and physical abuse toward her children. She is unable to see the beauty of her own children, and addicted to drugs, unable to alter the destructive path she has embarked upon. Compounding an already dysfunctional family situation, the husband is abusive to his wife and children as well, molesting his older son, which results in a dramatic plot twist later in the play.
Fanny, is a mother divorcing her husband after becoming a famous singer. In a bold move to pursue her dreams she had to leave her daughter Ellen, to be raised by her husband, Joe.

Cast
 Tyler Perry as Joe
 Shirley Marie Graham as Mary
 Sheila Stroud
 Ann Nesby as Fanny
 LaShun Pace as Sister Lewis
 Jamecia Bennett as Ellen
 Saycon Sengbloh
 Nevaina Graves
 Chandra Currelley as Emma
 Latrice Pace as Millie
 Ryan Shaw as Sam
 Darnell Harris
 Carl Pertile as Mitch
 Jasmine Ross as Lequita 
 Tamara Davis
 Quan Howell as Johnny
 Sonya Taylor as Sheniqua
 Bernadette Grant
 Sylvia Cannon

Shows

Musical Numbers
All songs written and/or arranged by Tyler Perry and Elvin D. Ross.
 "I Know I've Been Changed" - Mary
 "Don't Be Discouraged" - Emma
 "More Than Just a Sin" - Ellen
 "I Should Have Been There" - Mary
 "If Knew What To Do" - Mitch
 "Gotta Move Blues" - Joe
 "Old Time Mix" - Millie, Mary, Ellen
 "She's Gonna Live" - Ellen and Johnny
 "He Will Take Away All Your Pain/I Know I've Been Changed" (Reprise) - Company

Trivia
In this play, Tyler Perry portrays Joe, a character still being portrayed by Perry in his movies (as the brother of fan-favorite character, Madea).
While existing as one of Perry's first plays, it is one of the very least few that is not available on DVD.
This is the debut play of Tyler Perry.

References

Plays by Tyler Perry
African-American plays
1992 plays
Rape in fiction